James T. Higgins (born 3 February 1926) is an Irish former professional footballer who played as a centre forward. He was born in Dublin and played with Home Farm, and then for Dundalk in the League of Ireland, before transferring to Birmingham City in England in 1949. In a four-year spell at Birmingham he played 50 league games and scored 12 goals before returning to play with Dundalk again in 1953. 
        
Higgins played just once for the Republic of Ireland national football team, appearing in a 1–0 friendly defeat to Argentina in Dalymount Park on 13 May 1951.

References

1926 births
Possibly living people
Association footballers from County Dublin
Republic of Ireland association footballers
Ireland (FAI) international footballers
League of Ireland players
Home Farm F.C. players
Dundalk F.C. players
Birmingham City F.C. players
English Football League players
Association football forwards